"This Is the Thanks I Get (For Loving You)" is a song by Eddy Arnold. It was released in 1954 on the RCA Victor label (catalog no. 20-5805). It was written by Tommy Dilbeck.  In August 1954, it peaked at No. 3 on the Billboard country and western chart. It was also ranked as the No. 12 record on Billboards 1954 year-end country and western retail chart.

See also
 Billboard Top Country & Western Records of 1954

References

Eddy Arnold songs
1954 songs